Thiefth is an album by American musician David Grubbs and poet Susan Howe.

Track listing
 "Thorow"
 "Melville's Marginalia"

2005 EPs